Nico Rönnberg (born 14 April 1992) is a Finnish handball player who plays for US Ivry and the Finnish national team.

Achievements 
Finnish League:
Winner: 2014, 2015, 2016, 2017, 2018

Finnish Cup:
Winner: 2015, 2016, 2017, 2018

IHF Challenge Trophy:
Gold Medalist: 2011

Individual awards
 All-Star Left Back of the IHF Challenge Trophy: 2011

References

1992 births
Living people
Finnish male handball players
Expatriate handball players
Finnish expatriate sportspeople in Norway
Finnish expatriate sportspeople in France